Chekuthante Kotta is a 1967 Indian Malayalam-language horror thriller film, directed and produced by M. M. Nesan. The film stars Sathyan, Madhu, P. J. Antony and Sankaradi. The film had musical score by B. A. Chidambaranath.

Plot

Cast 
Sathyan as Lawrence
Madhu as Venugopal
Sankaradi
Ambika as Yamuna
Bahadoor
J. A. R. Anand as Ponnan
S. P. Pillai

Soundtrack 
The music was composed by B. A. Chidambaranath and the lyrics were written by P. Bhaskaran.

References

External links 
 

1960s horror thriller films
1960s Malayalam-language films
1967 films
Indian horror thriller films